E. arenarius  may refer to:
 Elymus arenarius, a synonym for Leymus arenarius, a grass species native to Europe and the coldest shores of North America
 Eresus arenarius, a synonym for Stegodyphus lineatus, a spider species found in Europe

See also
 Arenarius (disambiguation)